John H. Williams may refer to:

 John H. Williams (businessperson), American businessperson
 John H. Williams (film producer) (born 1953), American film producer
 John Harry Williams (1908–1966), Canadian-American physicist
 John Hartley Williams (1942–2014), English poet
 John Henry Williams (baseball) (1968–2004), American businessperson
 John Henry Williams (economist) (1887–1980), American economist
 John Henry Williams (New Zealand politician) or Jack Williams (1919–1975), New Zealand Member of Parliament
 John Henry Williams (politician) (1870–1936), Welsh Member of Parliament
 John Henry Williams (soldier) or Jack Williams (1886–1953), Welsh soldier
 John Hugh Williams (born 1939), New Zealand judge

See also 
 John Hay-Williams (1794–1859), Welsh baronet
 John Williams (disambiguation)
 John Henry Williams (disambiguation)